The Motorola Triumph is an Android powered smartphone available in the United States exclusively through Virgin Mobile USA. The device is similar to Huawei's U9000 Ideos X6 model sold internationally. The Triumph is the first Motorola-branded device sold by Virgin Mobile USA. Sprint Nextel and Motorola announced the Triumph at a joint press event held in New York City on June 9, 2011. 

The Triumph features a 4.1-inch capacitive touch screen, a 1 GHz Qualcomm MSM8655 Snapdragon processor, a rear-facing 5-megapixel camera with auto-focus, LED flash, and 720p HD video recording, a front-facing VGA camera, and Android 2.2 Froyo.

The Triumph does not include the MOTOBLUR interface commonly found on other Android-powered Motorola devices. The Triumph is the first device to come preloaded with Virgin Mobile USA's new Virgin Mobile Live 2.0 app, a social networking music application. The Triumph is the third Android device to come to Virgin Mobile. The Samsung Intercept was Virgin Mobile's first Android device followed by the LG Optimus V.

See also
List of Android devices
Galaxy Nexus

References

External links
Motorola Triumph official web page

Android (operating system) devices
Triumph
Sprint Corporation
Discontinued smartphones